Ralph Edward Hosking (born August 8, 1927) is a Canadian former professional hockey player who played 217 games for the Springfield Indians and Syracuse Warriors in the American Hockey League.

External links
 

1927 births
Living people
Canadian ice hockey defencemen
Oakland Oaks (PCHL) players